Stephen Michael Andrade (born February 6, 1978) is a former Major League Baseball right-handed relief pitcher who last played professionally in 2009. He is an alumnus of California State University, Stanislaus.

Career
Andrade made his Major League Baseball debut with the Kansas City Royals on May 1, against the Detroit Tigers at Comerica Park in Detroit, Michigan. He was designated for assignment by the Royals on June 10 a month after being optioned to the Triple-A Omaha Royals. He then joined the San Diego Padres organization, pitching for the Padres' Triple-A affiliate, the Portland Beavers.

On December 1, 2006, Andrade signed a minor league contract with the Tampa Bay Devil Rays. On February 22, he signed with the York Revolution of the independent Atlantic League of Professional Baseball.

References

External links

Minor League Splits and Situational Stats

1978 births
Kansas City Royals players
Living people
Major League Baseball pitchers
Baseball players from California
Provo Angels players
American River Beavers baseball players
Stanislaus State Warriors baseball players
Cedar Rapids Kernels players
Rancho Cucamonga Quakes players
Arkansas Travelers players
Salt Lake Stingers players
Omaha Royals players
Portland Beavers players
Durham Bulls players
York Revolution players
People from Woodland, California
Sioux City Explorers players
Grand Prairie AirHogs players